James Duckworth was the defending champion but lost in the quarterfinals to Rinky Hijikata.

Hijikata won the title after defeating Rio Noguchi 6–1, 6–1 in the final.

Seeds

Draw

Finals

Top half

Bottom half

References

External links
Main draw
Qualifying draw

City of Playford Tennis International - 1